Alberto Meschi (27 May 187911 December 1958) was an Italian anarchist, trade union organizer, writer, and anti-fascist fighter.

Meschi was born on 27 May 1879 in Borgo San Donnino (now Fidenza), Parma, Kingdom of Italy. He was involved in the workers' movement in La Spezia from a young age, working as a bricklayer. By 1899, he had become a political writer, creating articles for Pro Coatti, the union magazine L'Edilizia, and the anti-militarist La Pace.

After emigrating to Argentina in 1905, Meschi mixed with anarcho-syndicalist militants and became involved in union organizing and writing. He returned to Italy in 1909 after being expelled from Argentina. He took up similar activities in Italy, writing for the anarchist newspaper Il Libertario and being heavily involved in the Camera del Lavoro from 1919 to 1922.

Meschi was drawn to Carrara, a hotbed of anarchist and union activity, where his organizing work with Ugo Del Papa led to a two-week strike by quarry workers in the summer of 1911 that resulted in improved conditions. A year later, a general strike occurred within the marble industry for the right to a pension. In the spring of 1913, workers in Carrara and Versilia achieved the eight-hour day. The most difficult struggle occurred at the end of that year and in early 1914, involving a lockout in the marble industry. Meschi, Del Papa, and Riccardo Sacconi were all arrested on 11 January 1914, but a strong reaction led to their release on 31 January and the end of the lockout.

In 1912, Meschi helped to found the Unione Sindacale Italiana (USI) a revolutionary syndicalist organisation. With the outbreak of the First World War, the USI experienced a major split over the issue of Italian involvement in the war. The pro-war minority were thrown out of or left the USI in September 1914, with the passing of a motion by Meschi which expressed "their trust in the proletariat of all countries to rediscover in themselves the spirit of class solidarity and the revolutionary energy required to take advantage of the inevitable weakening of State forces and of the general crisis caused by the war in order to act to sweep away the bourgeois and monarchist states which have been cynically preparing for this war for fifty years".

Meschi was conscripted to fight in the Italian army and became a prisoner in the Carpathians. After the war, he returned to Carrara and rejoined the General Council of the USI, but by 1922 he had left for France to escape fascist repression. In Paris, he helped to found the Antifascist Concentration and the Italian League for Human Rights, also being a member of the Pietro Gori group of anarchists. He also founded the exile newspaper La Voce del Profugo and magazine Il Momento.

With the outbreak of the Spanish Civil War, Meschi joined the Rosselli Column, fighting until the fall of the Republic. After returning to France and being imprisoned in a concentration camp, he escaped to Italy in 1943. With the Italian Liberation, he returned to the Camere del Lavoro in Carrara, where he served until 1947. He was also involved in the publication of Il Cavatore (The Quarry Worker), a libertarian workers' news sheet. He died in Carrara on 11 December 1958.

References

Italian anarchists
Italian anti-fascists
Italian people of the Spanish Civil War
Italian male writers
People from Fidenza
1879 births
1958 deaths
Anarcho-syndicalists
Italian exiles